Blues-ette Part II is an album by trombonist Curtis Fuller recorded in 1993 and released by the Japanese Savoy label.

Reception

Michael G. Nastos of Allmusic called it "A solid recording from top to bottom with no filler or cereal, and showcasing a good chunk of Golson's many great works, this comes easily recommended to all modern mainstream jazz lovers without hesitation".

Track listing 
 "Love Your Spell Is Everywhere" (Edmund Goulding, Elsie Janis) – 7:09
 "Sis" (Benny Golson) – 4:25
 "Blues-ette '93" (Curtis Fuller) – 4:39
 "Is It All a Game?" (Golson) – 5:46
 "Capt' Kid" (Fuller) – 4:51
 "Five Spot After Dark" (Golson) – 4:56
 "How Am I to Know" (Jack King, Dorothy Parker) – 5:27
 "Along Came Betty" (Golson) – 6:50
 "Autumn in New York" (Vernon Duke) – 4:44
 "Manhattan Serenade" (Louis Alter, Howard Johnson) – 6:28

Personnel 
Curtis Fuller – trombone
Benny Golson – tenor saxophone
Tommy Flanagan - piano
Ray Drummond – bass
Al Harewood – drums

References 

1993 albums
Savoy Records albums
Curtis Fuller albums